Stäketskogen Nature Reserve is a nature reserve in Upplands-Bro Municipality, Stockholm County in Sweden.

The nature reserve has been created to protect an area of old-growth mixed coniferous forest. The area is hilly, with glacial till, and has been subjected to a very low degree of forestry. It is a known habitat for several species of endangered insects and bracket fungi.

References

External links

Nature reserves in Sweden
Geography of Stockholm County
Tourist attractions in Stockholm County
Protected areas established in 1989
1989 establishments in Sweden